Doctor Philastus Hurlbut (February 3, 1809 – June 16, 1883) was a 19th-century Latter Day Saint dissenter. Hurlbut is best known for his collection of affidavits which in 1834 were published in Eber D. Howe’s anti-Mormon book Mormonism Unvailed . The purpose of these affidavits was to produce damaging evidence related to the character of Joseph Smith, the founder of the Latter Day Saint movement, Smith's family, and his associates.

Life and work

Hurlbut was born in Chittenden County, Vermont. He was a Methodist preacher in Jamestown, New York, and joined Joseph Smith's Church of Christ sometime in 1832 or 1833. He was ordained as an elder of the church on March 18, 1833, by Sidney Rigdon.

In June 1833, Hurlbut was excommunicated from the church on charges of sexual immorality. A contemporary author discusses Hurlbut’s background by noting that prior to joining the Mormons, Hurlbut had been expelled from his Methodist congregation for "unvirtuous conduct with a young lady." As a member of the Latter Day Saint church, Hurlbut "immediately commenced his old practices, in attempting to seduce a young female.... [F]or this crime he was immediately expelled from the church." In response to his expulsion from the church, Hurlbut "now determined to demolish, as far as practicable, what he had once endeavoured to build up."

Hurlbut began travelling throughout the country, giving lectures against Mormonism.

At the request of an anti-Mormon Ohio committee, Hurlbut traveled to Palmyra, New York, where Smith had lived when Mormonism was developed and obtained affidavits from people who were familiar with the Smith family. His journey was done for the purpose of "collecting statements disparaging to the Smith name." One modern Latter Day Saint author states that Hurlbut's task was to "obtain information that would show 'the bad character of the Mormon Smith Family,' divest Joseph of 'all claims to the character of an honest man,' and place him at an 'immeasurable distance from the high station he pretends to occupy.'" One Presbyterian historian has speculated that the gathering of the affidavits was "revenge" by the three local Presbyterian leaders for a claim made by Joseph's mother, Lucy Mack Smith, that they had "conspired to destroy the Book of Mormon."

To accomplish his task, Hurlbut traveled in Ohio, New York, and Pennsylvania collecting statements disparaging to the Smith name.

When Hurlbut read the Spalding manuscript, he said, "I obtained a manuscript... which was reported to be the foundation of the Book of Mormon... when upon examination I found it to contain nothing of the kind, but being a manuscript upon an entirely different subject."

In 1834, Hurlbut was arrested for allegedly threatening Smith's life. A judge released him on his own recognizance and ordered him to keep the peace. Hurlbut later moved to Gibsonburg, Ohio, where he joined a branch of the United Brethren Church and became an elder in 1846. In 1847, he became a member of the board of trustees of Otterbein College. He was excommunicated therefrom in 1851 on the charge of "having engaged in improprieties with the opposite sex." Hurlbut died in Gibsonburg.

Notes

References

Sources

External links
D. P. Hurlbut Chronology by Dale R. Broadhurst

1809 births
1883 deaths
Converts to Mormonism from Methodism
Former Latter Day Saints
Mormonism-related controversies
People excommunicated by the Church of Christ (Latter Day Saints)
American evangelicals
People from Sandusky County, Ohio
People from Chittenden County, Vermont
People from Jamestown, New York
Oberlin College people
Critics of Mormonism
People excommunicated by Christian churches